Ian Welsh (born 10 March 1933) is a British rower. He competed in the men's eight event at the 1956 Summer Olympics.

References

External links
 

1933 births
Living people
British male rowers
Olympic rowers of Great Britain
Rowers at the 1956 Summer Olympics
Sportspeople from Birmingham, West Midlands